Vacchi is a surname. Notable people with the surname include:

 Fabio Vacchi (born 1949), Italian composer
 Roberto Vacchi (born 1965), Italian-Swedish sports commentator
 Sergio Vacchi (1925-2016), Italian painter

See also
 7600 Vacchi, main-belt asteroid discovered in 1994
 Vacchi Piedmont Glacier, on the Scott Coast, in Victoria Land